Neelima Azeem (born 2 December 1958) is an Indian actress, classical dancer, writer and the mother of actors Shahid Kapoor and Ishaan Khatter. She is known in India for her roles in television shows.

Early life
Neelima Azeem's father was Anwar Azeem, a Marxist journalist and Urdu author from Bihar, and her mother, Khadija, was a relative of Khwaja Ahmad Abbas. Azeem studied the Kathak form of Indian classical dance and was trained under Birju Maharaj and Munna Shukla.

Career
Azeem appears in both Hindi-language movies and in television series, she also did many historical and drama movies, Phir Wahi Talash, Amrapali, The Sword of Tipu Sultan and Junoon. In 2014, she performed at the PanchTatva annual Kathak festival organized by Birju Maharaj's Kalashram at Bhartiya Vidya Bhavan Campus in Mumbai. She also worked in the Hindi movie Sadak opposite Deepak Tijori.

Personal life 
She married Pankaj Kapoor in the year 1979 but they later divorced. Her son Shahid Kapoor is a Bollywood actor. She later married Rajesh Khattar and had a son Ishaan Khattar who is also a Bollywood actor.

Filmography

Films

Television

Web series

References

External links
 
 

Living people
Indian film actresses
Actresses in Hindi cinema
Actresses in Malayalam cinema
Indian television actresses
1959 births